The Noose is a Singapore comedy television series produced by Mediacorp Channel 5, the country’s English language channel.

The name of the show plays on the words The News. The show satirises socio-cultural and political issues in Singapore as well as newsworthy local and regional incidents involving Singapore.

The show has received recognition both locally and internationally. It earned a nomination at the International Emmy Awards 2011 in the comedy category. The cast has also been nominated and won awards and commendations at the Asian Television Awards.

Overview

The Noose is a parody of local news programmes such as News 5 Tonight, with fictional news reports and a presentation mimicking that of the actual news bulletin. For example, every episode of News 5 Tonight begins with a CGI clock indicating the time, while every episode of the first two seasons of The Noose would spoof it by displaying the time using something more mundane, such as a plastic clock hanging on a wall or an alarm clock. At the beginning of every episode, there is a candid disclaimer, voiced by Andre Chichak (portrayed by Alaric Tay), telling the viewers that the stories are not true, most notably by using the line ‘Believing us is like believing that...’ (e.g., believing that drinking a certain energy drink (Red Bull) makes you fly).

Each episode stars Michelle Chong, Chua En Lai, Alaric Tay and Suhaimi Yusof, with various actors and actresses as newscasters, field reporters and interviewees. The names of characters and issues highlighted in various sketches are often a caricature or parody of a newsworthy incident of the week.

Most recently, Maha has joined the cast and portrays Ma Hum, Molester Moon Face & Colkate Brand Ambassador.

Cast and characters
 Chua En Lai (Seasons 1- )
 Alaric Tay (Seasons 1- )
 Suhaimi Yusof (Seasons 1- )
 Judee Tan (Seasons 1- )
 Michelle Chong (Seasons 1–5, 7- )
 Siti Khalijah (Seasons 7- )
 Kayly Loh (Seasons 9- )
 Gurmit Singh (Season 1)

Roy Terse

 Name: Roy Terse
 Age: 48
 Nationality: Singaporean
 Race: Often mistaken as Sikh, but is truly a Eurasian
 Language: English (in various accents)
 Education: S&M University - PhD in Numerology, Master in Home Economics, Bachelor in Singapore Rock Music History
 Career: Child actor in Aksi Mat Yoyo (Age 6 - 10) - he was the orange cat.
 Part-time TOTO results announcer for 93.3 Radio (Age 30 - 35)
 Anchor for Al Abishgebaboom Network during the "US War against Terrorism" (Age 35 - 45)
 Awards: Best Male Toto results Announcer (2000) - there was only 1 nomination that year
 Role: News Anchor
 Seasons: 1
 Note: Roy Terse is a play on the word Reuters, a British-based news service.

Windy Miao

 Name: Windy Miao
 Role: Weather Reporter
 Seasons: 1
 Note: His given name, Windy, is a play on the fact that he talks about the wind and weather. He is also very camp.

Nancy Goh

 Name: Nancy Goh
 Language: English, (Mother Tongue is not too good)
 Age: 48
 Career: Shareholder
 Role: Interviewee
 Seasons: 3, 4, 5, 7, 8
 Note: One of her daughters is currently in Raffles Junior College, previously from Raffles Girls' School, and another is currently studying in a polytechnic. Her son is currently serving BMT in Pulau Tekong. She hates being interviewed by The Noose and tries to drive them away. When she talks, she always looks a little down with her glasses on her nose with eyes looking up. She is often recognised by locals as a parody of the stereotypical "kiasu" Singaporean tiger mother.

Adrianna Wow

 Name: Adrianna Wow
 Age: 21 (so she claims)
 Nationality: Singaporean (Asian born but American claims-to-be)
 Race: Chinese but claims to be "pure American Chinese"
 Language: US-spoken English, US-spoken Hokkien, US-spoken Cantonese, used to know how to speak Mandarin 2 years ago
 Education: Englewood University, Compton, Los Angeles
 Career: Runway model, Miss Hawaiian Tropics (2005)
 Awards: Best Weather Girl (2001), Best Hairdo (2001, 2002, 2003, 2004, 2005), Most Bimbotic Smile of The Year 2006
 Role: News Anchor
 Seasons: 1, 2, 3, 4, 5, 7, 8
 Note: Was B.B. See's co-anchor. Feminine and overly-sensitive much to the annoyance of B.B. See, she often introduces herself with a pause (or comma) between her name and surname (Adrianna, Wow!). Unike her co-anchor, she speaks with a California accent. She was replaced by Xin Hua Hua for the sixth season. She returned in the seventh season, and rotated with the other two newscasters B.B. See and Xin Huahua. She is an obvious spoof of Channel NewsAsia anchorwoman Andrea Chow.

Leticia Bongnino

 Name: Leticia Bongnino
 Career: Domestic Maid
 Language: Filipino-accented English with several Tagalog phrases
 Seasons: 1, 2, 3, 4, 5, 7, 8
 Note: Leticia speaks with a stereotypical Filipino accent. She often greets the audience as "sir" and "ma'am", and begins each interview by stating her name and occupation. The character has featured on the MediaCorp TV Channel 8 Chinese language show Black Rose (爆料黑玫瑰) and the Channel 5 gameshow We Are Singaporeans, both portrayed by Michelle Chong.

Nida Goodwood

 Name: Nida Goodwood
 Role: News Reporter
 Email: nidwood@thenoose.con (loose@noose.con.job in earlier episodes)
 Seasons: 1, 2, 3, 4, 5, 7, 8
 Note: She speaks in a very uptight manner, with a slight Received Pronunciation accent. Her name is a play on the phrase "Need a good wood", which suggests sexual innuendo and also refers to Nina Goodwood, a journalist with the SBC during the 1990s.

Barbarella

 Name: Barbarella (her "last name" changes with each appearance)
 Race Chinese (but her "mother tongue isn't very good")
 Role: Interviewee
 Seasons: 1, 2, 3, 4, 5, 7, 8
 Note: A vapid SPG (she pronounces it as "aspergers") and President of the Singapore SPGs Club. She speaks with a pseudo-accent (a mixture of Australian and Singlish) and is obsessed with Caucasian men (she uses the Singaporean slang word of Hokkien origin, "ang moh", when referring to them) and Western culture (Especially Australian Culture). She is named after two of her role-models Conan the Barbarian and Cinderella. Her character has featured on two Scoot commercials in Gold Coast.

Lulu

 Name: Lulu
 Nationality: Mainland Chinese
 Race: Chinese
 Language: Putonghua, Mandarin-accented English
 Career: KTV Hostess, Weather Girl, Foreign Talent Assimilator
 Role: Interviewee & Weather Girl
 Seasons: 3, 4, 5, 7
 Notes: Lulu is a KTV hostess who is occasionally a weather girl. She speaks with a distinct Chinese accent. Her catchphrase involves her greeting audiences in Mandarin, but corrected and told to speak English. (你好，我是Lulu。 (turns to director) Speak English, OK, OK.) When first introduced, she was surprised that the show is not in Mandarin. However, through the episodes she becomes more used to the reminder to speak English.

Barbarella, Leticia and Lulu were ambassadors in the new launch of the "Jewel @ Buangkok" condominium advertisement. Lulu needed no reminder for the Mandarin TVC.

Jacques Ooi

 Name: Jacques Ooi
 Age: 46 (looks very young, because apparently he's a good friend of plastic surgeon Woffles Wu)
 Nationality: Singaporean on weekdays, Malaysian on weekends (dual citizenship)
 Race: Pan-Asian (as he wants us to quote and unquote)
 Language: Hainanese, Cantonese, Hokkien, Teochew, and other dialects of various provinces in China as well as English, French and Mandarin
 Education: MTUC University - Majored (but failed) in "Ass-tronomy" (astronomy)
 Career: PR Manager of Rochor Canal Network, Hand Model for Crimewatch Season 1, 2, 3, 4, 5 and 7
 Awards: Best Parrot Trainer Award (2001)
 Role: Field Reporter
 Email: jooi@thenoose.con
 Seasons: 1, 2, 3, 4, 5, 6, 7, 8
 Note: Jacques pronounces his name as "Jack-ass" and has a habit of wearing a very short tie.  The only time he pronounced his name as "Jacques" is when he spoke in French during a report on taxi drivers.

B. B. See

 Name: See Beh Biang
 Role: News Anchor
 Seasons: 2, 3, 4, 5, 6, 7
 Note: B.B.See's name refers to BBC (British Broadcasting Corporation) and speaks with a received pronunciation accent (better known as BBC English). He is a caricature and composite of  BBC Newsreaders and reporters such as Peter Donaldson, David Frost, Mike Neville and regional ITV Presenters such as Andrew Gardner . His real name See Beh Biang is taken from local Hokkien slang; see beh means "very" and biang connotes dismay at something. The initials BBC are also an abbreviation for British Born Chinese.

Esmond Wan Mo Peh

 Name: Esmond Wan Mo Peh
 Role: Minister at Large, Ministry Without A Portfolio
 Seasons: 2, 3, 4, 5, 6, 7, 8
 Note: The name is a play on the phrase "Want More Pay", a dig at the reported high salaries of Singapore politicians. Wan's dress style is a parody of Prime Minister Lee Hsien Loong. He was originally known as just Wan Mo Peh, but after the announced salary adjustments in 2012 to ministerial pay, he was just referred to and known as Esmond Wan. Wan originally spoke Standard Singapore English, but began to speak in basilectal Singaporean English in later episodes, as a dig at politicians who speak "half-past-six" English.

Kim Johnny Un

 Name: Kim Johnny Un
 Role: Son of the North Korean leader
 Seasons: 4
 Note: He is a parody of Kim Jong Un and is commonly known only as "Johnny". During interviews, he speaks in hip hop slang, likely a parody of Korean hip hop.

Pornsak Sukhumvit

 Name: Pornsak Sukhumvit
 Role: Thai correspondent, pole-dancing instructor
 Seasons: 5, 6, 7, 8
 Note: He is not to be confused with Pornsak Prajakwit, a Mediacorp artiste. It is implied that he is a kathoey due to his effeminate mannerisms. There is a running gag where he tries to recite the full ceremonial name of Bangkok, but stops and simply calls the city Bangkok (with the exception of his debut appearance in which he did announce its full name). His character has featured on two Scoot commercials for its Gold Coast route and on the Channel 5 game show We Are Singaporeans. He also appeared in the Mediacorp sitcom Spouse for House as a pole-dancing instructor.

Channel 5 held a talent search programme, Are You Noose Enough, for a cameo in The Noose 6. Pornsak explained the eligibity requirements, and cameos featured include Alaric Tay, Darin Law, Chris Brownie and Diablo Tay. A Noose report featuring the Are You Noose Enough contestants as the main cast, was also shown in the final episode.

Andre Chichak

 Name: Andre Chichak
 Age: 17 (he's so good at his job that you can't tell he's an intern)
 Nationality: East Timorese
 Race: TBC (To be confirmed)
 Language: English, Indonesian, Malay, Mandarin
 Education: Farquhar Polytechnic majoring in "Stage Choreography for Integrated Resort Cabarets"
 Career: Never had one
 Awards: Best Story Telling Award (consecutively from Pr 1 to Pr 8 Mono) in Pulau Ubin Primary School
 Role: Field Reporter
 Email: acdc@thenoose.con (acdc@noose.con.job in earlier episodes)
 Seasons: 1, 2, 3, 4, 5, 6, 7, 8
 Note: Chichak speaks with a nasal sound. His surname refers to the Malay name ("cicak", pronounced chee-chak) for a common house gecko.

He is the ambassador for Secrets of the Fallen Pagoda: Treasures from Famen Temple and the Tang Court at the Asian Civilisations Museum.

Nicholas Le Fong

 Name: Nicholas Le Fong
 Role: Taxi driver, interviewee
 Seasons: 3, 4, 5, 6, 7
 Note: Nicholas is originally from Hong Kong. His catchphrase is "Stupiak", an amalgamation of "stupid" and the onomatopoeia "piak" (a slapping sound).

Kim Chiong Hil

 Name: Kim Chiong Hil
 Role: North Korean leader
 Seasons: 3, 4
 Note: He is a parody of Kim Jong Il and speaks with the same nasal voice as Andre Chichak but with a Korean accent.

Xin Hua Hua

 Role: News Co-anchor
 Seasons: 6, 7, 8
 Notes: Replaces Adrianna Wow as co-anchor in Season 6. Poached from Chinese news network CCTV according to B.B. See (amidst carrying the name of another Chinese news agency, Xinhua). He is narcissistic, and always starts the episode with the cheesy line, "Hey Ladies,..."

Richard Wang

 Role: Cameraman ("Cheap Foreign Talent")
 Seasons: 5, 6
 Notes: His protest on working conditions in season 6 is a satirical take on the Chinese construction worker crane protest in early 2013.

Kevin Kang Ah Roo

 Role: Tour Guide
 Seasons: 6
 Notes: He had a recurring segment in season 6 where he introduced the viewers to tourist attractions in Australia, in conjunction with budget carrier Scoot which sponsored the season. His name is also a play on the word kangaroo.

Characters portrayed by Suhaimi Yusof

Jojo Joget
 Name: Jojo Joget
 Role: Field Reporter
 Email: joget@thenoose.con (jogetlaid@noose.con.job and jojojo@thenoose.con in earlier episodes)
 Seasons: 2, 3, 4, 5, 6, 8
 Note: His name is a play on the joget dance and he mimicks it when signing off his reports.

Henderson Pooper
Name: Henderson Pooper
 Role: War Reporter
 Seasons: 6
 Note: Henderson is a war correspondent and police beat reporter for The Noose. He is asthmatic, with attacks usually coinciding with sudden shelling of bullets and bombs. His name is a play on CNN's Anderson Cooper.

Kim Bong Cha
 Name: Kim Bong Cha
 Role: North Korean correspondent
 Seasons: 4
 Note: Kim Bong Cha secretly has a crush on North Korean dictator Kim Jong Il's son and heir apparent, Kim Jong Un. Her stiff mannerisms and accent are a parody of North Korean news anchors and reporters, such as Ri Chun-hee.

See Yan Yan
 Name: See Yan Yan
 Role: Intern Field Reporter
 Notes: See Yan Yan's name is a pun of CNN (Cable News Network). She is not to be confused with Yeo Yann Yann, a Malaysian actor. Yan Yan speaks in a faux, posh accent, and is somewhat flirtatious.

Rose Pork
 Name: Rose Pork Char Siew (Pok Cha-Siu)
 Role: Hong Kong Correspondent
 Notes: Rose Pork is a pun of Roast Pork (char siu). Rose speaks Hong Kong English and Cantonese. She often compares Singapore to Hong Kong, envying Singapore's culture and cleanliness while calling Hong Kong a cramped city. She supports Pro-British Colonialism in Hong Kong.

Personalities Spoofed
 Sudah Anandas (Subhas Anandan)
 Sam Tamales (Mas Selamat)
 MC Kena Hammer (MC Hammer)
 Lady Yahya (Lady Gaga)
 Ling Pan Pan (Pan Lingling)
 Reese Low (Ris Low)
 Adrian Pong (Adrian Pang)
 Kim Chiong Hil (Kim Jong-Il)
 Harry Gan (David Gan)
 Violenz Oon (Violet Oon)
 Tom Cook (Tim Cook)
 Samosa Lee (Amos Yee)

Production 
The third season began airing on 1 June 2010. The fourth season began airing on 8 March 2011. The fifth season began airing on 27 December 2011 and features topics such as the Mayan Calendar and doomsday and other relevant current issues.

A sixth season began airing on 2 April 2013, aligned with the renumbering of Mediacorp news programmes. Chong did not return to the cast for the sixth season due to a disagreement between Mediacorp and her.

A seventh season began airing on 1 April 2014 (April Fools’ Day), with Chong returning to the show as part of the cast and writer for the show.

In 2015, the eighth season was set to be the last season due its lowest ratings but ratings had dropped among Channel 5's programme.

In 2016, a theatrical production, The Noose And Kakis … 11 Months Of Fresh Air, based on the TV series was produced, featuring the original cast and staged at the Mediacorp's building. The production was partly an effort to renew another season, the ninth season. on TV.

Awards

See also

 The Day Today
 Brass Eye
 On The Hour

References

External links
 Official Site on Mediacorp website

Singaporean comedy television series
Singaporean television sitcoms
News parodies
2000s satirical television series
2010s satirical television series
2000s Singaporean television series
2010s Singaporean television series
2016 Singaporean television series endings
Channel 5 (Singapore) original programming